Homoeocera papalo is a moth of the subfamily Arctiinae. It is known only from a very restricted area in Oaxaca state in Mexico, at high altitude.

The length of the forewings is 20–21 mm. The biology of this species is unknown.

Etymology
The name is a reference to the type locality, Concepción Pápalo, a small city in north east Oaxaca state. The name Papalo means butterfly.

References

Euchromiina
Endemic Lepidoptera of Mexico
Fauna of the Sierra Madre de Oaxaca
Moths described in 2010